Ambrogio Doria (Genoa, 1550 - Genoa, June 12, 1621) was the 94th Doge of the Republic of Genoa.

Biography 
Member of the powerful Doria family, he was the son of Paolo Doria and Tommasina Grimaldi. The appointment in 1621 to the Dogate, the forty-ninth in biennial succession and the ninety-fourth in Genoese republican history, was aroused by the sudden brain stroke that led the new doge Ambrogio Doria to death, in Genoa, on June 12 of the same year. Doria was married to Gerolama Centurione and had three children: Paolo Francesco, Maria and Paola.

See also 

 Republic of Genoa
 Doge of Genoa

References 

17th-century Doges of Genoa
1550 births
1621 deaths